The TV Land Awards was an American television awards ceremony that generally commemorated shows now off the air, rather than in current production as with the Emmys. Created by Executive Producer Michael Levitt, the awards were hosted and broadcast by the TV Land network from 2003–2012 and then returned to the air in 2015 and 2016. No TV Land awards show was scheduled for the spring of 2017.

Awards are given in various categories (which change slightly from year to year) and originally included awards voted on by visitors to TV Land's website; they are given to both individual actors/actresses and to entire television series. The TV Land Award statuettes are made by New York firm, Society Awards.

In March 2013, TV Land announced that there would be no TV Land Awards for that year. A network spokesman said, "We love the TV Land Awards and think there is great value in the franchise, but we will not be producing the show this spring.” After skipping 2014 as well, the Awards returned on April 18, 2015. For the 2016 ceremony, the awards were renamed the "TV Land Icon Awards". The annual ceremony hasn't been staged since the spring of 2016.

Dates, Hosts and Venues

Recipients
The following table summarizes the recipients of TV Land's "Discretionary Awards", which do not include any of the awards voted on by viewers (which are generally awarded to actors/actresses or characters).

References

External links
Official TV Land Awards All Access Pass 

American television awards
Awards established in 2003
TV Land original programming
2003 establishments in the United States